The Amsterdam Women's Sevens began in 2005. On 4 October 2012, the IRB announced the launch of the IRB Women's Sevens World Series, the women's counterpart to the wildly successful IRB Sevens World Series for men. The inaugural 2012–13 season featured four events, with the Amsterdam Sevens as the final event in May 2013. The 2014–15 World Rugby Women's Sevens Series was the last series to feature Amsterdam as an event.

Rugby Union Sevens - a short form of the sport of rugby union - was first played in 1883, with the first (men's) internationals taking place in 1973. As women's rugby union developed in the 1960s and 1970s the format became very popular as it allowed games, and entire leagues, to be developed in countries even when player numbers were small, and it remains the main form the women's game is played in most parts of the world.

However, although the first Women's international rugby union 15-a-side test match took place in 1982, it was not until 1997 before the first Women's International Rugby Union Sevens tournaments were played, when the Hong Kong Sevens included a women's tournament for the first time. Over the next decade the number of tournaments grew, with almost every region developing regular championship. This reached its zenith with 2009's inaugural women's tournament for the Rugby World Cup Sevens, shortly followed by the announcement that women's rugby sevens will be included in the Olympics from 2016.

The Amsterdam Sevens began in 1972, but did not include an international women's tournament until 2005. The following are details of all Amsterdam women's international tournaments, listed chronologically with the earliest first, with all result details, where known.

NOTE: New Zealand Wild Ducks and Aotearoa Maori New Zealand. Prior to the early 2000s, the NZRFU would not condone or send any official team, but an invitation team made up largely of Black Ferns and upcoming talented players did go to the HKG 7s each year in the late nineties from the inception of the HKG tournament. This team was named the Wild Ducks. It had no official status whatsoever, and the matches it played cannot be considered official internationals. The first official NZ team took part in 2000 and 2001, but from 2002 onwards the NZRFU again declined to send a team, whereby interested women's rugby officials from the Bay of Plenty in particular received the union's blessing to send a Maori team "Aotearoa" to HKG. For the first couple of years this team was pretty much strictly Maori in its makeup. However, for the later tournaments Black Ferns and upcoming players of any ethnicity were selected. It is not an official team and its matches should not be considered internationals but it has the union's blessing to compete in international tournaments.

2005
No known international entrants

Semi-final
W.O.P. 26-14 Simon Fraser U 	
Samurai Women 19-14 Henley Hawks
Final
W.O.P 0-60 Samurai Women

2006
20–21 May 2006
No information available.

2007
Complete results not available.

Semi-finals
Canada 0-40 Wooden Spoon (ENG)
Red Dragons (WAL) 0-33 Richmond

Final
Wooden Spoon 27-7 Richmond

2008
17–18 May 2008.
DAY ONE (17 May)

Pool 1

Canada	47-0	Pirates	
Wooden Spoon	53-0	Waterland Dames
Moody Cows	12-7	Pirates	
Canada	65-0	Waterland Dames	
Wooden Spoon	46-0	Moody Cows
Waterland Dames	0-45	Pirates	
Canada	31-0	Moody Cows	
Wooden Spoon	47-0	Pirates	
Moody Cows	29-5	Waterland Dames
Wooden Spoon	12-12	Canada

Pool 2

Hanze 	5-15	OA Airlines Business Class
Pink Ba-bas	0-36	Brazil Gold
Aotearoa Maori	59-0	OA Airlines Business Class
Hanze 	0-73	Brazil Gold
Pink Ba-bas	0-57	Aotearoa Maori
Brazil Gold	41-0	OA Airlines Business Class
Hanze 	0-63	Aotearoa Maori
Pink Ba-bas	12-5	OA Airlines Business Class
Aotearoa Maori 	33-0	Brazil Gold
Pink Ba-bas	20-0	Hanze

Pool 3

AAC Amsterdam	32-0	OA Airlines Economy Class
USA	64-0	Czech Republic	
Susies Valkyries	49-0	OA Airlines Economy Class
AAC Amsterdam	10-26	Czech Republic	
USA	49-0	Susies Valkyries	
Czech Republic	45-5	OA Airlines Economy Class
AAC Amsterdam 5-40	Susies Valkyries	
USA	78-0	OA Airlines Economy Class	
Susies Valkyries	31-5	Czech Republic
USA	56-0	AAC Amsterdam

Pool 4

Norwegian Raiderettes	19-21	Corsolettes
Bassets 	0-28	Brazil Blue	
Samurai St George's 56-0	Corsoletts
Norwegian Raiderettes	5-35	Brazil Blue	
Bassets 	0-60	Samurai St George's
Brazil Blue	7-12	Corsolettes	
Norwegian Raiderettes	0-61	Samurai St George's
Bassets 	0-43	Corsolettes	
Samurai St George's 	49-0	Brazil Blue
Bassets	10-19	Norwegian Raiderettes
DAY TWO (18 May)

Plate tournament (9th-16th place)

Plate quarter-finals
Czech Republic	24-21	OA Airlines Business Class
AAC Amsterdam	7-29	Pink Ba-bas
Moody Cows	17-31	Brazil Blue
Norwegian Raiderettes	0-42	Pirates

Plate semi-finals
Czech Republic	7-26	Pirates
Brazil Blue	19-7	Pink Ba-bas

Plate final
Pirates	31-5	Brazil Blue

Cup tournament (1st-8th place)

Cup Pool 1

USA	44_0	Corsolettes
Wooden Spoon	5-5	Brazil Gold
USA	24-0	Brazil Gold	
Wooden Spoon	27-5	Corsolettes
Brazil Gold	40-5	Corsolettes
USA	33-0	Wooden Spoon

Cup Pool 2

Aotearoa Maori 	12-5	Canada	
Samurai St George's	42-0	Susies Valkyries
Aotearoa Maori  	40-0	Susies Valkyries
Samurai St George's	26-0	Canada	
Canada	38-0	Susies Valkyries	
Samurai St George's	7-19	Aotearoa Maori

Cup semi-finals
Samurai St George's 14-5 USA
Aotearoa Maori	48-0	Brazil Gold

Cup final
Samurai St George's	24-5	Aotearoa Maori

2009
16–17 May
Pool 1

Samurai International Ladies 24-7 Norwegian Raiderettes
Czech Republic 26-24 RC The Bassets
Susies Valkyries 43-0 Pink Ba- ba's
RC The Bassets 26-25 Norwegian Raiderettes
Samurai International Ladies 50-0 Pink Ba- ba's
Czech Republic 0-31 Susies Valkyries
Pink Ba- ba's 0-29 RC The Bassets
Samurai International Ladies 38-0 Susies Valkyries
Czech Republic 28-5 Norwegian Raiderettes
Samurai International Ladies 43 0 RC The Bassets
Czech Republic 26-10 Pink Ba- ba's
Susies Valkyries 38-7 Norwegian Raiderettes
Samurai International Ladies 62-0 Czech Republic
Pink Ba- ba's 26-7 Norwegian Raiderettes
Susies Valkyries 17-21 RC The Bassets

Quarter-finals
Samurai 48-0 AAC Amsterdam
RC The Bassets 5-29 Corsolettes
Susies Valkyries	0-24	Germany
Czech Republic	0-48	Wooden Spoon

Plate Semi-finals
AAC Amsterdam	0-28	RC The Bassets
Susies Valkyries	12-14	Czech Republic

Plate Final
RC The Bassets	40-0	Czech Republic
Pool 2

Samurai International Ladies	24-7	Norwegian Raiderettes
Czech Republic	26-24	RC The Bassets
Susies Valkyries	43-0	Pink Ba- ba's	
RC The Bassets	26-25	Norwegian Raiderettes	
Samurai International Ladies	50-0	Pink Ba- ba's
Czech Republic	0-31	Susies Valkyries	
Pink Ba- ba's	0-29	RC The Bassets
Samurai International Ladies	38-0	Susies Valkyries
Czech Republic	28-5	Norwegian Raiderettes	
Samurai International Ladies	43-0	RC The Bassets
Czech Republic	26-10	Pink Ba- ba's
Susies Valkyries	38-7	Norwegian Raiderettes
Samurai International Ladies	62-0	Czech Republic
Pink Ba- ba's	26-7	Norwegian Raiderettes
Susies Valkyries	17-21	RC The Bassets

Wooden Spoon semi-finals
Pink Ba- ba's	19-5	Sabbie Mobili
Norwegian Raiderettes	26-5	Moody Cows

Wooden Spoon final
Pink Ba- ba's	5-15	Norwegian Raiderettes

Semi-finals
Samurai 45-0	Corsolettes
Germany	0-59	Wooden Spoon

Final
Samurai 22-10	Wooden Spoon

2010
22–23 May
Pool 1

Casale 	19-19	Thor
Olymp	26-0	Finland
Susies Valkyries	29-12	Thor
Casale 	26-5	Finland
Olymp	35-0	Susies Valkyries
Finland	17-5	Thor	
Casale 	28-0	Susies Valkyries
Olymp	34-0	Thor	
Susies Valkyries	17-19	Finland
Olymp	14-14	Casale

Pool 2

Ravin' Pumas	12	10	cpopartners.com
AAC Amsterdam 	0	33	Spain
Gameface Pacific	33	0	cpopartners.com
Ravin' Pumas	0	50	Spain
AAC Amsterdam 	5	35	Gameface Pacific
Spain 	45	0	cpopartners.com
Ravin' Pumas	0	56	Gameface Pacific
AAC Amsterdam	33	12	cpopartners.com
Gameface Pacific	5	33	Spain
AAC Amsterdam 	24	0	Ravin' Pumas

Pool 3

Germany 	22-7	Last Minute
WOP	45-0	RC The Bassets ladies	
Valsugana Rugby Padova	5-42	Last Minute
Germany 	47-5	RC The Bassets
WOP	70-0	Valsugana Rugby Padova	
RC The Bassets	7-17	Last Minute
Germany	54-0	Valsugana Rugby Padova
WOP	37-0	Last Minute	
Valsugana Rugby Padova	7-33	RC The Bassets
WOP	42-7	Germany
Plate quarter-finals
Ravin' Pumas	12-14	RC The Bassets
Susies Valkyries 35-0 Valsugana Rugby Padova
cpopartners.com 12-26	Thor

Plate semi-finals
Finland 38-0	RC The Bassets
Susies Valkyries	27-0	Thor

Plate final
Finland 14-12	Susies Valkyries

Cup Pool 1

Casale 	19-14	Gameface Pacific
WOP	38-0	Last Minute
Casale 	26-5	Last Minute
WOP	38-0	Gameface Pacific
Gameface Pacific 	21-12	Last Minute
WOP	38-5	Casale

Cup Pool 2

Olymp	17-5	Germany
Spain	48-0	AAC Amsterdam
Olymp	50-7	AAC Amsterdam
Spain 	21-12	Germany
Germany	15-7	AAC Amsterdam
Spain 	33-5	Olymp

Cup semi-finals
WOP	38-5	Olymp
Spain 33-0	Casale

Cup final
WOP	19-5	Spain

2011
21–22 May
DAY ONE - 21 May

Pool 1

Portugal 	26-5	Susies Valkyries
Netherlands	53-0	Poland
Portugal 	38-0	Poland
Netherlands	54-0	Susies Valkyries
Susies Valkyries	31-5	Poland
Netherlands 	31-0	Portugal

Pool 2

Brazil 	40-0	AAC Amsterdam
Spain 	41-0	Richmond Heavettes
Brazil	22-0	Richmond Heavettes
Spain 	45-0	AAC Amsterdam
AAC Amsterdam	24-5	Richmond Heavettes
Spain 	20-10	Brazil

Pool 3

OA Saints	0-57	Germany
Canada 47-0	Rugbyende Utrechtse Studente	
OA Saints	5-24	Rugbyende Utrechtse Studente	
Canada 	38-7	Germany
Canada 	77-0	OA Saints
Germany	52-0	Rugbyende Utrechtse Studente

Pool 4

Samurai	24-0	Netherlands Development
Gameface Norwegian Vikingettes	12-24	Georgia
Samurai	42-0	Gameface Norwegian Vikingettes
Netherlands Development	35-0	Georgia
Samurai 	22-7	Georgia
Netherlands Development	61-0	Gameface Norwegian Vikingettes

Pool 5

Wooden Spoon	30-0	Belgium
Olymp	43-0	Rugbyverbandes Baden-Württemberg	
Wooden Spoon	52_0	Rugbyverbandes Baden-Württemberg
Olymp	26-0	Belgium
Olymp	15-12	Wooden Spoon
Belgium	0-17	Rugbyverbandes Baden-Württemberg

Pool 6

Italy 	12-12	Esprit
Thorburg	29-10	Billa-Bonn Pandas
Italy 	54-7	Thorburg	
Esprit	44-5	Billa-Bonn Pandas
Italy 	48-0	Billa-Bonn Pandas
Esprit	74-0	Thorburg

Pool 7
Castricum	14-22	Raving Pumas
DAY TWO - 22 May

Plate/Bowl round
 Susies Valkyries (bye)
 Gameface Norwegian Vikingettes 22-5 Richmond Heavettes
 Rugbyende Utrechtse Studente 0-28 Belgium
 Castricum 0-12 AAC Amsterdam
 Georgia (bye)
 Rugbyverbandes Baden-Württemberg 34-0 OA Saints
 Billa-Bonn Pandas 0-38 Poland
 Thorburg (bye)

PLATE (13th-20th)

Plate quarter-finals
 Susies Valkyries 26-0 Gameface Norwegian Vikingettes
 Belgium 10-7 AAC Amsterdam
 Georgia 12-17 Rugbyverbandes Baden-Württemberg
 Poland 21-24 Thorburg

Plate semi-finals
 Susies Valkyries 31-7 Belgium
 Rugbyverbandes Baden-Württemberg 19-5 Thorburg

Plate final
 Susies Valkyrie 36-0 Rugbyverbandes Baden-Württemberg

BOWL (21st-28th)

Bowl quarter-finals
 Richmond Heavettes (bye)
 Rugbyende Utrechtse Studente 12-24 Castricum
 OA Saints (bye)
 Billa-Bonn Pandas (bye)

Bowl semi-finals
 Richmond Heavettes 24-5 Castricum
 OA Saints 26-20 Billa-Bonn Pandas

Bowl final
 Richmond Heavettes 40-0 OA Saints

CUP (1st-12th)

Cup Pool 1

Germany 7-38 Wooden Spoon
Spain 21-0 Wooden Spoon
Spain 26-12 Germany

Cup Pool 2

Olymp 15-7 Portugal
Samurai 29-7 Portugal
Samurai 26-5 Olymp

Cup Pool 3

Esprit 7-29 Canada
Brazil 5-28 Canada
Esprit 10-29 Brazil

Cup Pool 4

Italy 26-0 Netherlands Development
Netherlands 34-5 Netherlands Development
Netherlands 12-7 Italy

Cup semi-finals
 Spain 0-15 Samurai
 Canada 26-19 Netherlands

Cup final
 Samurai 12-31 Canada

2012
Silver Pier Tournament
DAY ONE

Group A

 26-12 
 19-0 
 41-5 
 26-0 
 7-12 
 12-12 

Group B

 19-10 
 15-5 
 19-0 
 33-0 
 19-7 
 12-19 

Group C

 21-0 
 30-0 
 20-0 
 19-5 
 14-5  
 5-19 
DAY TWO

Cup: Pool A

USA 15 Australia 14
Spain 7 Australia 10
USA 12 Spain 12

Cup: Pool B

Netherlands 17 England 0
Netherlands 7 Canada 24
England 12 Canada 12

Plate: Pool A

Wales 12 Germany 5
Ireland 17 Germany 12
Ireland 26 Wales 0

Plate: Pool B

Scotland 7 South Africa 5
Scotland 7 France 31
France 12 South Africa 0

11th/12th place
Germany 21-0 South Africa
9th/10th place
Wales 0-12 Scotland
7th/8th place
Ireland 7-5 France
5th/6th place
Spain 12-18 England
3rd/4th place
Australia 15-14 Netherlands
Cup Final: 1st/2nd place
USA 17-26 Canada

Shield Tournament

DAY ONE - 21 May

Pool 1

Blackrock 22-5 Finland
Switzerland 14-7 Red T's
Blackrock 31-5 Red T's
Switzerland 17-5 Finland
Finland 7-21 Red T's
Switzerland 7-20 Blackrock

Pool 2

Susies Sevens 33-5 Danish Vikings
Netherlands Development 19-0 Thor
Susies Sevens 17-21 Thor
Netherlands Development 28-5 Danish Vikings
Danish Vikings 7-14 Thor
Netherlands Development 14-26 Susies Sevens

Pool 3

Dambusters Thistles Squadron 5-26 Lorraine
Poland 12-5 Castricum
Dambusters Thistles Squadron 0-24 Castricum
Poland	24-10 Lorraine
Lorraine 5-24 Castricum
Poland 14-12 Dambusters Thistles Squadron

Pool 4

Austria 14-5 AAC Rugby
Wildcats 0-24 RBW Frauen
Austria 42-0 Wildcats
AAC Rugby 0-24 RBW Frauen
Austria 0-24 RBW Frauen
AAC Rugby 20-0 Wildcats
DAY TWO

Pool A

Austria 12-29 Thor
Blackrock 12-0 Thor
Blackrock 44-0 Austria

Pool B

Switzerland 12-0 Lorraine
RBW Frauen 26-0 Lorraine 
RBW Frauen 0-31 Switzerland

Pool C

Netherlands Development 19-5 AAC Rugby
AAC Rugby 5-29 Poland
Poland 0-31 Netherlands Development

Pool D

Castricum 19-5 Red T's
Susie's Sevens 35-10 Red T's
Susie's Sevens 24-7 Castricum

Semi-finals
Blackrock 19-12 Susie's Sevens
Switzerland 12-22 Netherlands Development

Final
Blackrock 7-12 Netherlands Development

2013

IRB Women's Sevens World Series
17–18 May 2013

Group A

 17-5 
 19-0 
 24-0 
 0-22 
 15-0 
 31-0 

Group B

 17-14 
 7-8 
 12-5 
 36-7 
 0-14 
 14-12 

Plate Semi Finals (5th-8th)
 15-5 
 7-10 

7th/8th Match 
 14-12 

Plate final: 5th/6th Match 
 12-17 

Group C

 31-5 
 24-0 
 24-0 
 17-5 
 5-10 
 26-0 

Bowl Semi Finals (9th-12th)
 31-0 
 19-7 

11th/12th Match 
 12-26 

Bowl final:9th/10th Match 
 32-0 

Quarter-finals (1st-8th)
 14-5 
 10-19 
 19-0 
 5-19 

Cup Semi Finals (1st-4th)
 24-10  
 7-12 

3rd/4th place
 26-5 

Cup Final: 1st/2nd place
 33-24

Women's Shield
18–19 May 2013

Day one

Group A

 22-5 
 21-0 Tabusoro
 24-10 Tabusoro
 24-12 
 7-5 
 38-5 Tabusoro

Group B

Paname Utd 28-0 Lorraine
 36-0 Lorraine
 19-14 Paname Utd

Group C

 0-7 Blackrock College 
Blackrock College 0-31 
 0-29 

Group D

Susies 7s 21-5 AAC Dames 
AAC Dames 7-24 
 24-5 Susies 7s

Day two

Group E

 29-0 Lorraine
 26-0 Lorraine
 12-22 

Group F

 14-0 
 19-7 Blackrock College
 28-7 Blackrock College

Group G

 31-0 AAC Dames
AAC Dames 15-14 Susies 7s
 27-0 Susies 7s

Group H

 24-7 
Paname Utd 27-0 
 0-43 Paname Utd

Semi Finals
 27-0 Paname Utd 
 19-14 

Final 
 36-0

2014

IRB Women's Sevens World Series

16–17 May 2014

Group A

New Zealand 43-7 United States
Spain 19-14 Ireland
New Zealand 28-7 Ireland
Spain 0-39 United States
New Zealand 19-5 Spain
United States 29-0 Ireland

Group B

Australia 24-5 France
Russia 20-5 South Africa
Australia 29-7 South Africa
Russia 19-10 France
Australia 36-5 Russia
France 26-0 South Africa

Plate Semi Finals (5th-8th)
Brazil 0-34 United States
France 0-24 Russia

7th/8th Match 
Brazil 5-14 France

Plate final: 5th/6th Match 
United States 27-12 Russia

Group C

Canada 28-0 Brazil
England 36-5 Netherlands
Canada 21-5 Netherlands
England 19-5 Brazil
Canada 5-10 England
Brazil 5-0 Netherlands

Bowl Semi Finals (9th-12th)
Spain 12-26 South Africa 
Netherlands 24-0 Ireland

11th/12th Match 
Spain 5-7 Ireland

Bowl final:9th/10th Match 
South Africa 7-29 Netherlands

Quarter-finals (1st-8th)
Australia 33-0 Brazil
Canada 28-19 United States
England 7-0 France
New Zealand 36-0 Russia

Cup Semi Finals (1st-4th)
Australia 17-0 Canada
England 10-26 New Zealand

3rd/4th place
Canada 10-0 England

Cup Final: 1st/2nd place
Australia 12-29 New Zealand

Women's Shield
17–18 May 2014
Results for national teams:

Georgia: 
SATURDAY 17-05-2014
DUKKIES (NL) W 21-12 
Brasil Women's 7s Development Team L 0-24 
Lorraine (FR) W 14-5

SUNDAY 18-05-2014
Wales Dragon's L 0-41 
Germany L 0-19

Germany: 
SATURDAY 17-05-2014
Utrecht Dames W 33-7 
Dambusters Ladies W 36-7 
FRANCE DEVELOPMENT L 0-19

SUNDAY 18-05-2014
Georgia Ladies W 19-0 
Wales Dragon's L 0-24

NORWEGIAN VIKINGETTES
SATURDAY 17-05-2014
Green Lightning (IRE) 12-0 
Susies Sevens 0-24 
AAC Amsterdam Ladies 0-17

SUNDAY 18-05-2014
Saxons Ladies 33-5 
Utrecht Dames 0-19

POLAND 7'S LADIES
SATURDAY 17-05-2014
Dutchband's Paarse Rebellen 12-14 
Blackrock College RFC, Ireland 10-24
WEST COAST VIKINGS 5-27

SUNDAY 18-05-2014
Switzerland 19-7 
DUKKIES 19-0 
Netherlands Development 7-24 SF plate

SWITZERLAND
SATURDAY 17-05-2014
Orbital Dutch lions 5-19 
Saxons Ladies 28-5 
Wales Dragon's 5-45

SUNDAY 18-05-2014
Poland 7's Ladies 7-19 
DUKKIES 31-12

WALES DRAGON'S
SATURDAY 17-05-2014
Saxons Ladies 39-0 
Orbital Dutch lions 26-7 
Switzerland 45-5

SUNDAY 18-05-2014
Georgia Ladies 41-0 
Germany 24-0 
FRANCE University 10-0 SF
Tribe7s 5-40 (AUS) FINAL

2015

Women's Silver Pier
DAY ONE - 23 May

Pool 1

Norwegian Vikingettes	0-17	Suomi 7's Ladies
Irish National Women's Seven's	54-0	Ushizi Warriors
Norwegian Vikingettes	45-5	Ushizi Warriors
Irish National Women's Seven's	45-0	Suomi 7's Ladies
Suomi 7's Ladies	50-5	Ushizi Warriors	
Irish National Women's Seven's	52-0	Norwegian Vikingettes

Pool 2

Poland 7s	26-0	Dambusters Ladies
Germany	29-0	RK 03 Berlin
Poland 7s	49-0	RK 03 Berlin
Germany	59-0	Dambusters Ladies
Dambusters Ladies	10-24	RK 03 Berlin
Germany	14-7	Poland 7s	

Pool 3

National team of Czech Republic	26-0	Movers n Shaikhas	
Wales Women	40-0	Paarse Rebellen	
National team of Czech Republic	19-12	Paarse Rebellen	
Wales Women	78-0	Movers n Shaikhas	
Movers n Shaikhas	0-26	Paarse Rebellen	
Wales Women	63-0	National team of Czech Republic

Pool 4

Georgia Ladies	0	20	Susies Ladies
Maple Leafs	38	7	Paris Ladies Sevens	
Georgia Ladies	5	17	Paris Ladies Sevens	
Maple Leafs	24	5	Susies Ladies	
Susies Ladies	22	7	Paris Ladies Sevens	
Maple Leafs	50	0	Georgia Ladies

Pool 5

Romania	12-19	Vixens	
France Development Feminin	70-0	NRV 7s	
Romania	14-5	NRV 7s	
France Development Feminin	45-0	Vixens	
France Development Feminin	31-0	Romania	
Vixens	21-10	NRV 7s

Pool 6

Swiss Women's 7's Rugby	21-0	Dukkies	
Tribe7s	36-0	AAC Ladies	
Swiss Women's 7's Rugby	24-10	AAC Ladies	
Tribe7s	75-0	Dukkies	
Dukkies	17-25	AAC Ladies	
Tribe7s	32-7	Swiss Women's 7's Rugby	

Pool 7

West Coast Vikings	12-0	Windmills	
Amazonas	17-10	RC The Bassets	
West Coast Vikings	10-5	RC The Bassets	
Amazonas	31-5	Windmills	
Windmills	0-17	RC The Bassets	
Amazonas	17-10	West Coast Vikings

Pool 8

Scottish Select	40-0	Helvetian Hawkbit Sevens	
Wooden Spoon Marauders	34-0	LORRAINE	
Scottish Select	48-0	LORRAINE	
Wooden Spoon Marauders	57-0	Helvetian Hawkbit Sevens	
Helvetian Hawkbit Sevens	0-46	LORRAINE	
Wooden Spoon Marauders	17-17	Scottish Select
DAY TWO

Pool 1

Wooden Spoon Marauders	24-5	Susies Ladies	
Wales Women	33-5	Vixens	
Wooden Spoon Marauders	21-17	Vixens	
Wales Women	38-12	Susies Ladies	
Susies Ladies	21-31	Vixens	
Wales Women	22-0	Wooden Spoon Marauders

Pool 2

Germany	36-0	Suomi 7's Ladies	
DEVELOPPEMENT FEMININ	12-7	West Coast Vikings	
Germany	33-7	West Coast Vikings	
DEVELOPPEMENT FEMININ	32-0	Suomi 7's Ladies	
Suomi 7's Ladies	7-15	West Coast Vikings	
DEVELOPPEMENT FEMININ	21-0	Germany

Pool 3

Maple Leafs	57-0	Poland 7s	
Tribe7s	43-0	National team of Czech Republic	
Maple Leafs	54-12	National team of Czech Republic	
Tribe7s	26-5	Poland 7s	
Poland 7s	5-24	National team of Czech Republic	
Tribe7s	19-21	Maple Leafs

Pool 4

Amazonas	7-10	Scottish Select	
Irish National Women's Seven's	43-0	Swiss Women's 7's Rugby	
Amazonas	24-0	Swiss Women's 7's Rugby	
Irish National Women's Seven's	38-0	Scottish Select	
Scottish Select	10-5	Swiss Women's 7's Rugby	
Irish National Women's Seven's	31-0	Amazonas

Semi-finals
Ireland 19-14 Wales
Maple Leafs 12-7 France Developpement

Final
Ireland 14-26 Maple Leafs

International results in Shield competition
Norway 5-7 Georgia
Romania 15-12 Georgia
Norway 7-39 Romania

Shield final
Windmills 22-12 Romania

World Rugby Women's Sevens Series

22–23 May 2015

Notes

 
World Rugby Women's Sevens Series tournaments
Women's rugby union in the Netherlands
Rugby sevens competitions in Europe
Women's sports competitions in the Netherlands
Women in Amsterdam